On March 4, 1966, Canadian Pacific Air Lines Flight 402 (CP402) struck the approach lights and a seawall during a night landing attempt in poor visibility at Haneda Airport in Japan. Of the 62 passengers and 10 crew, only 8 passengers survived.

Course of events 
The aircraft involved was a McDonnell Douglas DC-8-43, registration  c/n 45761/237, delivered to the airline on October 14, 1965.

Flight 402 was a Hong Kong to Tokyo to Vancouver flight, which took off at 16:14 Japan Time from Kai Tak International Airport on the first leg of the journey. The flight was in a holding pattern for 38 minutes, waiting for visibility at the destination to improve from landing minima. At 19:58 local time, the pilot asked Air Traffic control for a diversion to Taipei Taiwan and commenced a climb from 3000 ft. The pilot then decided to make another approach.

The ground-controlled approach was normal until  when the aircraft was advised that it was  too low and advised to level off momentarily. Nevertheless the aircraft continued its approach 20 ft below and in parallel with the glide slope. After the aircraft passed the precision minimum the crew requested the intensity of the runway lights be reduced. The pilot lost control of the aircraft after it hit the seawall at the runway threshold, leaving a  trail of burning wreckage on the airfield.

Investigation 
The Japanese government-appointed investigation team concluded in their report, issued two years later, that there was no fault in the airport's control tower. They stated the cause was pilot error, while acknowledging that poor visibility could have caused an optical illusion that confused the pilot. The probable cause statement was that the "Pilot misjudged landing approach under unusually difficult weather conditions."

Crashes in Japan 
This accident was one of five fatal aircraft disasters—four commercial and one military—in Japan in 1966. Less than 24 hours later, BOAC Flight 911, a Boeing 707, taxied past the still smoldering wreckage of the DC-8, then broke up in flight shortly after departure when it encountered extreme clear-air turbulence in the lee of Mount Fuji while flying the opposite direction towards Hong Kong, killing all 124 passengers and crew. This brought the total death toll from both accidents to 188 in less than 24 hours.

Less than a month before, All Nippon Airways Flight 60, a Boeing 727, crashed into Tokyo Bay while on approach to land at the same airport, killing all 133 aboard. In addition, two other incidents occurred, on August 26 and November 13. The combined effect of these five accidents shook public confidence in commercial aviation in Japan, and both Japan Air Lines and All Nippon Airways were forced to cut back some domestic service due to reduced demand.

References 

Aviation accidents and incidents in 1966
Aviation accidents and incidents in Japan
1966 in Japan
Accidents and incidents involving the Douglas DC-8
402
Haneda Airport
March 1966 events in Asia
Airliner accidents and incidents caused by pilot error